The Far East Fleet (also called the Far East Station) was a fleet of the Royal Navy which existed between 1952 and 1971.

During the Second World War, the Eastern Fleet included many ships and personnel from other navies, including those of the Netherlands, Australia, New Zealand, and the United States. On 22 November 1944 the Eastern Fleet was re-designated East Indies fleet and continued to be based in Trincomalee. Following its re-designation its remaining ships formed the British Pacific Fleet. In December 1945 the British Pacific Fleet was disbanded and its forces were absorbed into the East Indies Fleet. In 1952 The East Indies Fleet was renamed the Far East Fleet. After the Second World War the East Indies Station continued as a separate command to the Far East until 1958. In 1971 the Far East Fleet was abolished and its remaining forces returned home, coming under the command of the new, unified, Commander-in-Chief Fleet.

Post-war
After the war, the East Indies Fleet was once again based at the Singapore Naval Base. The 1st Aircraft Carrier Squadron HMS Glory and ) arrived from the British Pacific Fleet in October 1945, and operated from Trincomalee, then Singapore, from October 1945 to October 1947. In 1952, the East Indies Fleet was redesignated the Far East Fleet. The Fleet then took part in the Malayan Emergency and the Confrontation with Indonesia in the 1960s.

The Flag Officer Second-in-Command Far East Fleet, for most of the postwar period a rear admiral, was based afloat, and tasked with keeping the fleet "up to the mark operationally". Meanwhile, the fleet commander, a vice admiral, ran the fleet programme and major items of administration 'including all provision for docking and maintenance' from his base in Singapore.

From February 1963 the remaining destroyer and frigate squadrons in the Far East Fleet were gradually amalgamated into Escort Squadrons. All were disbanded by the end of December 1966. Those in the Far East Fleet became the 1st, 2nd and 3rd Far East Destroyer Squadrons.  returned to service in June 1962 assigned to the 3rd Frigate Squadron of the Far East Fleet. She arrived at Colombo in October and was deployed in the Indian Ocean, calling at Diego Garcia and Malé, Maldives. She served with the Far East Fleet until mid-1967 before returning home to be paid off.

In November 1967 fleet senior officers supervised the final departure from Britain's beleaguered State of Aden. Rear Admiral Edward Ashmore, Flag Officer, Second-in-Command, Far East Fleet, serving as Commander Task Force 318, commanded the British warships assembled to cover the withdrawal from Aden and receive the final Royal Marine Commandos heli-evacuated from the RAF Khormaksar airfield.

The fleet was disbanded in 1971, and on 31 October 1971, the last day of the validity of the Anglo-Malayan Defence Agreement, the last Commander, Far East Fleet, Rear Admiral Anthony Troup, hauled down his flag.

Commander-in-Chief, Far East Fleet
Post holders included:

Flag Officer Second-in-Command Far East Fleet 
Included:

Chief of Staff, Far East Fleet 
Included:

Flag Officer, Malayan Area 

As the Malayan Emergency developed, the Flag Officer, Malayan Area's title changed as his areas of responsibility increased.

Commodore, Amphibious Forces, Far East Fleet 
Commodore, Amphibious Forces, Far East (COMAFFEF) was based at HMNB Singapore from May 1965 to March 1971.

The Navy established the Amphibious Warfare Squadron in March 1961, which was responsible to the Senior Naval Officer, Persian Gulf until August 1962. It then was reassigned to Flag Officer, Middle East, until April 1965. The squadron was then transferred to the Far East where it was renamed Amphibious Forces under the new Commodore, Amphibious Forces, Far East Fleet in May 1965. The post was discontinued in March 1971.

Incumbents included:

Commodore-in-Charge, Hong Kong 

This officer was based at HMS Tamar. He was responsible for administrating all naval establishments in Hong Kong including HMNB Hong Kong and, at times, exercised operational control over Royal Navy ships in that area.

Subordinate naval formations 
Units that served in the fleet included:

See also
South-East Asian Theatre of World War II
Indian Ocean naval campaigns 1942–45
List of Eastern Fleet ships

Notes

References 

 Mackie, Colin. (2018) "Royal Navy Senior Appointments from 1865" (PDF). gulabin.com. Colin Mackie. Scotland, UK.

 Watson, Dr Graham (2015). "Royal Navy Organisation and Ship Deployment 1947-2013". www.naval-history.net. Gordon Smith.

External links
Royal Navy in Pacific and Indian Oceans
The Royal New Zealand Navy, Chapter 23 "The New Zealand Cruisers", Sydney David Waters, Historical Publications Branch, Wellington (Part of: The Official History of New Zealand in the Second World War 1939–1945)
HMS Ceylon
Details of Far East Fleet Composition in the 1960s
Leading Air Mechanic Maurice Whiteing and his photographic record of HMS Indomitable with the Eastern Fleet

Fleets of the Royal Navy
Military units and formations established in 1952
Military units and formations disestablished in 1971